Benmoxin (trade names Neuralex, Nerusil), also known as mebamoxine, is an irreversible and nonselective monoamine oxidase inhibitor (MAOI) of the hydrazine class. It was synthesized in 1967 and was subsequently used as an antidepressant in Europe, but is now no longer marketed.

See also 
 Hydrazine (antidepressant)

References 

Abandoned drugs
Benzamides
Hydrazides
Monoamine oxidase inhibitors